Viau station is a Montreal Metro station in the borough of Mercier–Hochelaga-Maisonneuve in Montreal, Quebec, Canada. It is operated by the Société de transport de Montréal (STM) and serves the Green Line. It is in the district of Hochelaga-Maisonneuve. The station opened on June 6, 1976, as part of the extension of the Green Line to Honoré-Beaugrand station, in time for the 1976 Summer Olympics.

Overview 
Designed by architect Irving Sager, it is a normal side platform station built in a shallow open cut. The eastern end of the station is surmounted by the large station pavilion, which includes the ticket hall. There is no transept; stairs lead directly from the platforms to street level.

The eastern wall of the mezzanine is decorated by a non-figurative ceramic mural by Jean-Paul Mousseau, entitled Opus 74 and representing the Olympic flame and the tower of the Olympic Stadium.

In 2019, work to modernise the station, as well as expand the nearby underground workshop began. In November 2021, the station became the 19th accessible station in Montréal with the installation of elevators. Remaining work was completed in January 2022.

Origin of the name
This station is named for rue Viau, named for local industrialist Charles-Théodore Viau, who purchased nearby tracts of land and developed them as a neighbourhood later named Viauville.

Connecting bus routes

Nearby points of interest

 Olympic Stadium - Montreal Tower, Centre de natation
 Biodome
 Rio Tinto Alcan Planetarium
 Saputo Stadium
 Aréna Maurice-Richard
 Starcité
 Centre Pierre Charbonneau
 Insectarium
 Parc Maisonneuve
 Olympic Village - Régie du logement
 Montreal Botanical Garden

References

External links

 Viau Metro Station - official site
 Montreal by Metro, metrodemontreal.com - photos, information, and trivia
 2011 STM System Map
 Metro Map

Green Line (Montreal Metro)
Brutalist architecture in Canada
Mercier–Hochelaga-Maisonneuve
Railway stations in Canada opened in 1976